Area code 264 is the telephone area code of Anguilla in the North American Numbering Plan (NANP).  The area code was created in a split of the original numbering plan area with area code 809. Permissive dialing started 31 March 1997 and ended on 30 September 1997. The area code is also represented on the telephone dial by the letter sequence ANG.

In Anguilla, a local telephone number is dialed using the seven digits of the directory number. Calls from other NANP countries, including the United States, require dialing 1 264 and the seven digit number.  Prior to the 1990s, subscribers in Anguilla dialed just three digits for a local call, and had the only four-digit national number in the 809 area code: 4972.

See also
List of NANP area codes
Area codes in the Caribbean
Telephone numbers in the United Kingdom

External links
North American Numbering Plan Administrator
List of exchanges from AreaCodeDownload.com, 264 Area Code

264
Communications in Anguilla